Krameria ixine (abrojo colorado) is a perennial shrub of the family Krameriaceae, the Rhatanies. It is native to Puerto Rico, Haiti, Netherlands Antilles, Antigua and Barbuda, Grenada, Central America, and in South America (Guyana, Venezuela, and Colombia).

External links

Photo-1; Photo-2

ixine
Flora of Mexico
Flora of South America
Plants described in 1759
Taxa named by Carl Linnaeus